Telemundo Studios, formerly known as Telemundo Television Studios, is a division of NBCUniversal that develops original programming in Spanish.

History
After these agreements, Patricio Wills, former president of Telemundo-RTI, pass to be the person in charge of Telemundo Television Studios, and Marcos Santana, previous CEO of Tepuy International, will become the President of Telemundo International, division that will be in charge to distribute its programming abroad.

Telemundo Television Studios will continue producing telenovelas and other programs for Telemundo and will look for opportunities of production for other chains of Latin America.

See also 
List of United States television networks

External links

Telemundo